Jan Bartošek (born 10 November 1971) is a Czech politician and member of the Chamber of Deputies for the Christian and Democratic Union – Czechoslovak People's Party (KDU-ČSL) since October 2013. 

He is one of the candidates for the 2019 Christian and Democratic Union – Czechoslovak People's Party leadership election.

On 22 October 2019, the Chamber of Deputies passed a non-binding resolution "condemn[ing] all activities and statements by groups calling for a boycott of the State of Israel, its goods, services or citizens." Bartošek introduced the resolution.

References 

1971 births
KDU-ČSL MPs
Living people
People from Jihlava
Members of the Chamber of Deputies of the Czech Republic (2017–2021)
Members of the Chamber of Deputies of the Czech Republic (2013–2017)
Members of the Chamber of Deputies of the Czech Republic (2021–2025)
University of South Bohemia alumni
Czech University of Life Sciences Prague alumni
Palacký University Olomouc alumni